Seattle Hempfest is an annual event in the city of Seattle, Washington (and the world's largest annual gathering) advocating the legalization of cannabis. Vivian McPeak serves as the organization's executive director.  Founded in 1991 as the Washington Hemp Expo, a self-described "humble gathering of stoners" attended by only 500 people, and renamed the following year as Hempfest, it has grown into a three-day annual political rally, concert, and arts and crafts fair with attendance typically over 100,000. Speakers have included Seattle city council member Nick Licata, actor/activist Woody Harrelson (2004), travel writer and TV host Rick Steves (2007), (2010), 2012 Green Party speaker Jill Stein, Dallas Cowboys center Mark Stepnoski (2003), and former chief of the Seattle Police Department Norm Stamper (2006). Hempfest has also in recent years attracted such well-known performers as Fishbone (2002), The Kottonmouth Kings (2004), Rehab (2006), and Pato Banton (2007) to its five stages spread throughout Myrtle Edwards Park and Elliott Bay Park, on Seattle's waterfront.

History
Early Hempfests "featured blatant marijuana smoking"; 60 people were cited for illegal marijuana use at the 1997 Hempfest, and about 20 were arrested the following year. Eventually Hempfest and the police reached a modus vivendi: there was only one arrest in 2001. About this time, the director was Dominic Holden, who was also campaign manager of an organization trying to make cannabis the city of Seattle's lowest law enforcement priority through a voter initiative, . The political context surrounding marijuana in Seattle and Washington has changed considerably over the years. Washington legalized medical marijuana in 1998. In 2003, Seattle passed I-75.

The 2008 Seattle Hempfest, which took place August 16–17, set a new record for attendance, topping 310,000 people.  The volunteers of Seattle Hempfest were awarded the National Organization for the Reform of Marijuana Laws (NORML) award for "Outstanding Cannabis Advocate of the Year Award" on October 17, 2008 at the National NORML Conference for their efforts.

2011 Hempfest speakers included numerous elected officials, among them Ohio congressman Dennis Kucinich, Seattle Mayor Mike McGinn, City Attorney Pete Holmes, a return by Councilman Licata, and Washington State Representatives Mary Lou Dickerson and Roger Goodman.

2013 saw the legalization of cannabis use in Washington state; that year's Seattle Hempfest featured performances by Everlast, Hed PE and DJ Muggs of Cypress Hill. As of 2013, the festival had an annual budget of approximately $700,000.

The 2015 Hempfest named David Bronner, CEO of Dr. Bronner's Magic Soaps, the Cannabis Activist of the Year.

Notes

References
 Seattle Hempfest History: 1991-Present, Seattle Hempfest. Accessed 23 August 2007.
 Casey McNerthney, Where there's smoke, there's Hempfest, Seattle Post-Intelligencer, August 18, 2007. Accessed online 23 August 2007.

External links

 

1991 in cannabis
Cannabis events in the United States
Cannabis in Washington (state)
Hempfest
Recurring events established in 1991